Leaching is the loss or extraction of certain materials from a carrier into a liquid (usually, but not always a solvent). and may refer to:

Leaching (agriculture), the loss of water-soluble plant nutrients from the soil; or applying a small amount of excess irrigation to avoid soil salinity
Leaching (chemistry), the process of extracting substances from a solid by dissolving them in a liquid
Leaching (metallurgy), a widely used extractive metallurgy technique which converts metals into soluble salts in aqueous media
Dump leaching, an industrial process to extract metals from ore taken directly from the mine and stacked on the leach pad without crushing
Heap leaching, an industrial process to extract metals from ore which has been crushed into small chunks
Tank leaching, a hydro metallurgical method of extracting valuable material from ore
In-situ leaching, a process of recovering minerals such as copper and uranium through boreholes drilled into the deposit
Leaching (pedology), the loss of mineral and organic solutes due to percolation from soil
Bioleaching, the extraction of specific metals from their ores through the use of bacteria and fungi

See also
Leachate, the liquid that drains or 'leaches' from a landfill
Leach (disambiguation)
Leech (disambiguation)
Leeching (disambiguation)